Lighter Than Hare is a 1960 Warner Bros. Merrie Melodies animated short written and directed by Friz Freleng. The short was released on December 17, 1960, and stars Bugs Bunny. The title is a play on the phrase lighter than air. It was one of three Bugs cartoons that Freleng both wrote and directed, the others being From Hare to Heir (1960) and Devil's Feud Cake (1963).

Plot
The cartoon opens with the credits in outer space as the camera pulls up to Earth, to somewhere in the Pacific Northwest. After this, the scene changes to the deserted Highway 17, as a flying saucer from outer space lands and surveys the surrounding area with a periscope. At a city dump nearby, Bugs Bunny returns home, thinking he should move somewhere else, on account of the neighborhood "gettin' terribly rundown."

Inside the spaceship, Yosemite Sam of Outer Space, dressed in a green gloveless spacesuit, sees Bugs on his view screen. Summoning Robot ZX29B to the bridge, he orders the robot to go out and capture Bugs as part of their Earth mission. ZX29B trundles out of the spaceship to Bugs' hole and peeks down at him cleaning up after breakfast, making Bugs get the feeling he's being watched. ZX29B hides among some garbage cans when Bugs comes up from the hole with a pail of trash, making a note to remember to make an electronic trash disposal. Bugs thinks ZX29B is a new garbage can, and so he promptly opens his mouth like a lid and empties his trash into him. When Bugs leaves, ZX29B comes out coughing up the garbage.

Angered at the failure of the "stupidest robot [he's] got", Yosemite Sam summons the Demolition Squad, a trio of red robots, to the bridge and orders them to destroy Bugs. The robots, each with a fuselit barrel-shaped bomb, go into the dump. Seeing them coming, Bugs panics at the sight of the "spacemen" and dives into the pipe leading down to his underground bomb shelter. The robots proceed to dump their bombs down the pipe, and leave to head back to the ship. Escaping the shelter through a back way, an angered Bugs tosses a giant magnet down the pipe to "take care of those mechanized mobsters". The entire squad is pulled down the pipe, where the bombs explode and blow the squad to smithereens, prompting a Medic Robot to appear and sweep up the mess.

Angered at the Demolition Squad's failure, Sam decides he will go after Bugs himself and hops into an indestructible tank that he drives into the dump. When Sam scans the dump, he sees Bugs come up in a machine, that opens the tank hatch so it can drop a lit stick of dynamite into the tank. Sam tosses the dynamite out, but the machine drops it back in and rivets the hatch shut. Sam tries to hammer out the rivets, but the dynamite explodes sending Sam to drive his crippled tank back to the ship.

At this time, Bugs decides to make his getaway by taking a handcar from the Flag Station. Just after he cranks away, Sam gives chase in the spaceship. The spaceship lowers a ladder and Sam starts going down it, but he gets knocked off at a tunnel, falling to the ground stunned. The spaceship picks him up with an extending plunger and pulls him back into itself.

Sam catches up to Bugs via rocket pack and stops him at ray gun point. When Sam brags that Earth creatures can't maneuver very well, Bugs proves him wrong by spinning his ears like the blades on a helicopter and flies away. Sam shouts a catchphrase ("Yosemite Sam of Outer Space!") and tries to catch up by rocket pack, but misses when Bugs moves. When Bugs lands in a hole, Sam decides to wait so he can disintegrate Bugs the moment he comes out. While waiting, Bugs goes underground into an old tree stump behind Sam and secretly replaces his rocket pack with a lit stick of dynamite. Bugs flies out of the stump, and Sam, ready to chase after him, shouts his catchphrase just as the dynamite explodes and destroys his spacesuit ("Yosemite Sam of Outer - BANG! - Space?").

Back at the dump, Sam uses his Robot Ferret in his next attempt to catch Bugs. The Ferret descends into Bugs' hole and encounters a Robot Rabbit built by Bugs out of old war surplus equipment. Sounding like Marvin The Martian, the Robot Ferret threatens the Robot Rabbit with a ray gun to go with him. The Robot Rabbit agrees, provided that the Robot Ferret doesn't press the button on his stomach. Defiantly, the Ferret ignores the request and presses the button, releasing a metal block which smashes him to pieces.

Angered at seeing the Robot Ferret in ruins, Sam decides that he's through fooling around. Bugs, meanwhile, places a time bomb in another Robot Rabbit's stomach and dresses it up like himself. Outside, a huge ray gun emerges from Sam's Saucer and aims down at Bugs' hole, ready to blast Bugs, but Bugs, yelling out that he surrenders, sends out his decoy, which walks into the spaceship. Their mission "complete", Sam and the flying saucer take off and fly back to Sam's homeworld.

Later that night, Bugs turns on his war surplus radio and listens in as Sam presents the Robot Decoy to the planet's Potentate. The Potentate orders the Robot Rabbit decoy to come forward and when he orders the Robot to speak, its time bomb explodes in his presence. The dazed Potentate comments that Earth creatures always shoot off their mouths. Laughing at this, Bugs changes the channels wondering if Amos and Andy is on yet.

Cast
Mel Blanc as Bugs Bunny, Yosemite Sam, Robot ZX29B, Robot Rabbit, Robot Ferret, Alien Potentate

Home media
"Lighter Than Hare" is available, uncensored and uncut, on the Looney Tunes Superstars DVD. However, it was cropped to widescreen.

See also
 List of American films of 1960
 List of Bugs Bunny cartoons
 List of Yosemite Sam cartoons

References

External links

 Lighter Than Hare at Internet Movie Database

1960 films
1960 animated films
1960 short films
Merrie Melodies short films
Warner Bros. Cartoons animated short films
Short films directed by Friz Freleng
Films scored by Milt Franklyn
Animated films about extraterrestrial life
Animated films about robots
Films set in Oregon
Films set in Washington (state)
Films set in outer space
Bugs Bunny films
1960s Warner Bros. animated short films
Yosemite Sam films
1960s English-language films